Gedaliah Alon  (1901–1950) was an Israeli historian.

Biography
Gedaliah Rogoznitski (later Alon) was born in 1901 in Kobryn, Belarus (then in Russian-ruled Poland).
In 1924, he studied for a year at Berlin University and, in 1926, he emigrated to the British Mandate of Palestine and continued his studies at the Hebrew University of Jerusalem. He later joined the faculty of the Hebrew University.

Awards and recognition
In 1953, three years after his death,  Alon was posthumously awarded the Israel Prize for Jewish studies, the inaugural year of the prize.

Published works
 Jews, Judaism, and the Classical World: Studies in Jewish History in the Times of the Second Temple and Talmud; translated from the Hebrew by Israel Abrahams, Jerusalem: Magnes Press, the Hebrew University, 1977. 
 The Jews in their Land in the Talmudic Age (70-640 C.E.); translated and edited by Gershon Levi, Jerusalem: Magnes Press, the Hebrew University, 1980-1984; Cambridge, Mass.: Harvard University Press, 1989.

See also
List of Israel Prize recipients

References

Belarusian Jews
Humboldt University of Berlin alumni
Hebrew University of Jerusalem alumni
Academic staff of the Hebrew University of Jerusalem
20th-century Israeli historians
20th-century Israeli Jews
Israeli people of Belarusian-Jewish descent
Israel Prize in Jewish studies recipients
Israel Prize in Jewish studies recipients who were historians
Jewish historians
Jewish scholars
Historians of Jews and Judaism
Jews in Mandatory Palestine
People from Kobryn
Polish emigrants to Mandatory Palestine
1901 births
1950 deaths